Des rails sur la Prairie is a Lucky Luke comic written by Goscinny and Morris. It is the ninth album in the series and the first on which Goscinny worked. It is also the first in which Lucky Luke, moving away towards the setting sun at the last box, sings his song "I'm a poor lonesome cowboy ..." The comic was printed by Dupuis in 1957 and in English by Cinebook in 2011 as Rails on the Prairie.

Synopsis 
Lucky Luke must protect the construction of the railway to the West against the threats of a crooked shareholder of the stagecoaches who sees in the arrival of the train the end of his business.

The story is inspired by the construction of the line from Omaha to Sacramento, decided in 1862 during the American Civil War, but started only in 1865. The Central Pacific started from Sacramento and headed east, and the Union Pacific started from Omaha and went west, the junction was made at Promontory Summit in May 1869.

Characters 

 Yellow Foot Indians
 Crouching Bison: Chief of the tribe, after the failure of the attack on the train, he expels the men of Black Wilson by threatening them to scalp them if he sees them again.
 Terrible Vulture: Main deputy of Crouching Bison, he leads the attack of the tribe against the train and realizes that "Fire horse too fast".
 The villains
 Harry: Mayor of Nothing City, owner of the saloon and cattle breeder, under the influence of Black Wilson he opposed the railroad; he will change his attitude when the works allow the discovery of an oil deposit.
 Honest Smith: Dead Ox Gulch judge convinces Lucky Luke to defend the railway workers.
 Black Wilson: Owner of stagecoach companies, he does not want the railway to develop.

References

 Morris publications in Spirou BDoubliées

External links
 Lucky Luke official site album index 

Comics by Morris (cartoonist)
Lucky Luke albums
1957 graphic novels
Fiction set in the 1860s
Fiction about rail transport
Works by René Goscinny